Goldstar is the name used by three fictional characters in publications from DC Comics: Trixie Collins, Michelle Carter and Ernest Widdle.

Fictional character biographies

Trixie Collins
The Goldstar name was actually Booster Gold's original chosen superhero name, but when asked who he was by the President of the United States Ronald Reagan (whose life he had just saved), Booster mangled his old football nickname (Booster) and Goldstar. The President introduced him as Booster Gold and the name stuck.

Attempting to develop a female sidekick for Booster Gold, his corporation hires then S.T.A.R. Labs scientist Jack Soo to create a supersuit for her to wear; the resulting suit infused with magnetic energy which the wearer could use to "key" onto a metallic object to attract or repel the object or the wearer, mimicking the abilities of super-strength and flight. The costume was then dubbed with the name that Booster's corporation had at the time, Goldstar.

When a weak and physically ill Booster's life was threatened by an anti-superhero mob, Booster's personal secretary Theresa "Trixie" Collins reluctantly donned the costume to save his life and followed Booster when he traveled back to the future to save his life and re-power his depleted costume. When the group were finally able to return to the present, Trixie gladly gave the costume back, having no intention of ever becoming a superhero.

Michelle Carter
Booster's twin sister Michelle Carter traveled back in time like her brother and was interested in being a superhero. Michelle decided to explore the present, a time unfamiliar to her and "borrowed" the Goldstar costume. Michelle's suit has been shown to have more powers than originally seen, as she can now fire energy blasts from her wrists like her brother, that still appear as magnetically based, albeit on par with the fully energetic ones of her brother. It is also assumed that her suit was altered by Rip Hunter the same way that Booster's was, to protect her while traveling through the time stream, probably enhancing her abilities in the process, as Rip still has access to the same technology used to build and keep in shape the original Booster Gold suit. She later died during her adventures.

Her death is later revealed as fully expunged from the timeline: since no body was found after the explosion, Rip Hunter actually plucked her from her designed fate to deposit her safely years after her supposed death. Michelle spends some time blissfully unaware of the deeper implications of her return, until Jason Goldstein, the villainous Rex Hunter, deleted from his intended timeline by the Time Stealers because of Rip Hunter's actions, returns as a chronal energy being, forcing Goldstar to witness her intended fate. Despite Rex Hunter's defeat, Michelle is left deeply traumatized, and starts obsessing about her own death, strongly believing her life to be a glitch in the timeline. Resentful against Rip Hunter for having hidden her real fate from her, Goldstar disables Skeets with a powerful magnetic blasts, and escapes into the timestream to an unknown place.

While Rip and Booster tried to find her, they did not find any trace of her. She was revealed to be heading to Coast City in the eve of its destruction. Booster Gold found her in Coast City and brought her back to the present, but her boyfriend Drew died in Coast City's destruction. Afterward, this results in her contemplating going back to the 25th century. She informs Booster Gold, who convince her to remain with him and Rip.

Ernest Widdle
Ernest Widdle is a character in the Lobo comics and the younger brother of Bludhound. Goldstar thought that Lobo murdered his brother after witnessing Bludhound's death on the planet Harmony (although Bludhound actually dies of an incurable disease).

Goldstar was generally depicted as an antithesis to Lobo - kind, decent, clean-cut and generally a stick in the mud (as far as Lobo was concerned). All that Goldstar wished to do was encourage niceness, decency and heroism in the universe. For this, he is routinely beaten and brutalized by Lobo.

Goldstar would encounter Lobo multiple times. For a while, Goldstar had amnesia. Lobo (and at times, Jonas Glim) took advantage of this by claiming that Goldstar was his personal servant and tricking him into multiple humiliating situations. At one point, Goldstar is humiliated without Lobo's help; two ladies at Lobo's birthday party overcome the entire celebration and humiliate the men at gunpoint for their own reasons. Eventually, Goldstar recovers his memories and escapes.

It is revealed that Goldstar associates with a team of superheroes, all of whom are just as upbeat and moralistic as he is. They are also just as disaster-prone.

Goldstar spends some time shrunk down in Lobo's body, after an attempt to save a peace-minded diplomat goes wrong. Trapped with him is a biological specialist, Doctor Shapely, whom Goldstar resolves to protect at all costs. 

Later, the Godwave, a remnant of energy from the creation of the universe, was slinging through the universe, causing all sorts of havoc. Lobo, on the planet of Apokolips, is seemingly endangered by this wave. Goldstar dies in an attempt to save him, jumping into the Godwave itself.

References

Lobo (DC Comics)
DC Comics superheroes
Characters created by Alan Grant (writer)
Characters created by Dan Jurgens
Comics characters introduced in 1986
Comics characters introduced in 1994
Twin characters in comics